Sir Tim Waterstone (born 30 May 1939) is a British businessman and author. He is the founder of Waterstones, the United Kingdom-based bookselling retail chain, the largest in Europe.

Early life
Tim Waterstone was born on 30 May 1939 in Glasgow, Scotland. His father worked for a Glasgow tea company for over fifty years. He grew up in "a rather cramped, 1930s detached house ...  Ugly, unpretentious, nice big garden, fields at the end of it" in Crowborough, East Sussex, England. He was educated at Tonbridge School and St Catharine's College, Cambridge, where he read English.

Career
Waterstone worked for a broking firm in Calcutta, India. Upon his return to England he worked as a marketing manager for Allied Breweries, 1964–73 and then W.H. Smith, 1973–81.

Waterstone founded the bookselling chain Waterstone's in 1982, after he took a £6,000 redundancy payment from W.H. Smith.  He set up his first branch in Old Brompton Road, Kensington, west London, his personal model being of heavily stocked and heavily marketed literary bookselling in stores ranging from the large to the huge (Waterstone's London Piccadilly), driven by the recruitment of highly read staff, almost all Oxbridge or Russell Group arts graduates straight out of university, (many of whom went on in time to build prominent careers across the arts world in general). The model was successful, and by ten years later, 1992, Waterstone's had grown to be the largest bookselling group in Europe. He became the founder chairman of HMV Media Group in 1998, which merged the businesses of Waterstone's and HMV. He left the group in 2001.

Waterstone chaired the DTI Working Group on Smaller Quoted Companies and Private Investors in 1999. He was a founder investor in Bookberry, a Moscow booksellers modelled on Waterstone's. He became the chairman of Read Petite, an e-book company, in 2013.

Waterstone has published four novels: Lilley & Chase (Hodder 1994), An Imperfect Marriage (Hodder 1995), A Passage of Lives (Hodder 1996) and In For A Penny In For A Pound (Atlantic 2010). His short story The Tiffany Glass Panel was published in The Mail on Sunday in 1994.  He has published a semi-autobiographical business book, Swimming Against The Stream (Macmillan 2006) and many articles in the arts and business media. His memoir, The Face Pressed Against A Window was published by Atlantic Books in February 2019, as was the audiobook of the memoir, which he personally narrated. He appeared as a castaway in the BBC Radio programme Desert Island Discs broadcast on 4 August 2019.

Philanthropy and political activity
Waterstone was a chairman or board member of English International (1987–92), the London Philharmonic Orchestra (1990–97), Portman House Trust (1994–96), the Academy of Ancient Music (1990–95), Virago Press (1993–95), Jazz FM (1991–1993), the London International Festival of Theatre (1990–92), the Elgar Foundation (1992–98), the British Library (1995–97), King's College London Library (2000–02), Yale University Press (1992–2013), Chelsea Stores (1996–2007), FutureStart (1992–2009), Virago Press (1995–1996), Hill Samuel UK Emerging Companies Investment Trust plc (1996–2000) and Downing Classic VCT (1998–2003).

He has sat on the Booker Prize Management Committee, and acted as the Chairman of Judges for the Prince's Youth Business Trust Awards. He served as a member of the visiting committee of Cambridge University Library (2007–2013). He chaired Shelter's 25th Anniversary Appeal. He served as Chancellor of Edinburgh Napier University (2007–2015).

Waterstone supports the Labour Party (he chose Clement Attlee as his 'hero' in the initial 2001 BBC Radio 4 series Great Lives). He was opposed to the Iraq War and took part in demonstrations against it. Waterstone is a campaigner for the three parties of the Left to merge into a new Labour Liberal Green Party - the LLG - so that their votes are no longer dispersed over the three, increasing the chance of electoral success.

Personal life
Waterstone is twice divorced. He is married to TV and film producer and novelist Rosie Alison. They have eight children, one of them being actress Daisy Waterstone. He resides in Holland Park, London.

Waterstone is a member of the Garrick Club. He is an Honorary Fellow of St Catharine's College Cambridge.  He was knighted in the 2018 Birthday Honours for services to bookselling and to charity.

References

External links
Waterstones online

Living people
1939 births
Alumni of St Catharine's College, Cambridge
British Anglicans
British retail company founders
Businesspeople awarded knighthoods
Businesspeople from Glasgow
Knights Bachelor
People associated with Edinburgh Napier University
People educated at Tonbridge School
People from Crowborough
British republicans